Beattie may refer to:

People
 Beattie (surname)
 Beattie Feathers (1909–1979), American football player
 Beatrice Bellman ("Beattie"), a fictional Jewish mother played by Maureen Lipman, featured in a British Telecom advertising campaign

Places
 Beattie, Kansas, United States
 Dalbeattie, Scotland

Other uses
 Beattie (automobile)
 Beatties of London, usually known as just "Beatties", former toy and model shop 
 Beatties, UK department store group acquired by House of Fraser in 2005

See also
Beatty (disambiguation)